Hastings Bwalya (born 25 August 1985) is a Zambian boxer who won the 2007 All-Africa Games at junior welter, and then competed in the 2008 Summer Olympics.

Career
Bwalya was defeated in the first round of the 2006 Commonwealth Games at lightweight, and moved up a division. He beat Herbert Nkabiti from Botswana in the 2007 All-African final. In 2008 he qualified for Beijing. He was edged out 21:22 by Moroccan Driss Moussaid in the semis but beat Abdelrahman Salah for the third spot. At the Olympics he lost his first bout 8:12 to Mongolian Uranchimegiin Mönkh-Erdene.

He compiled a 12-0 record as a professional. His career was placed on a hiatus after he sustained an injury.

External links
Bio
Africa 2007
Qualifier

1985 births
Living people
Light-welterweight boxers
Boxers at the 2008 Summer Olympics
Olympic boxers of Zambia
Boxers at the 2006 Commonwealth Games
Commonwealth Games competitors for Zambia
Zambian male boxers
African Games gold medalists for Zambia
African Games medalists in boxing
Sportspeople from Lusaka
Competitors at the 2007 All-Africa Games